Lakehead can refer to:

Geographic

 The head of Lake Superior (and of the Great Lakes), typically referring to the Thunder Bay–Duluth region
 Lakehead, California, a census-designated place
 Lakehead-Lakeshore, California, a former census-designated place

Education
 Lakehead University in Thunder Bay, Ontario

Pipelines
 Lakehead Pipeline, in both Canada and the United States